Cenabis bene, mi Fabulle, apud me is the first line, sometimes used as a title, of Carmen 13 from the collected poems of the 1st-century BC Latin poet Catullus. The poem belongs to the literary genre of mock-invitation. Fabullus is invited to dine at the poet's home, but he will need to bring all the elements of a dinner party (cena) himself: the host pleads poverty. Catullus will provide only meros amores, "the essence of love", and a perfume given to him by his girlfriend, granted to her by multiple Venuses and Cupids, guaranteed to make Fabullus wish he were totum nasum ("all nose").

Latin text and translation

References

C013
Works about parties
Articles containing video clips